Boss of Rawhide is a 1943 American Western film written and directed by Elmer Clifton. The film stars Dave O'Brien, James Newill, Guy Wilkerson, Nell O'Day, Ed Cassidy and Jack Ingram. The film was released on November 20, 1943, by Producers Releasing Corporation.

Plot
The boss of the Rawhide district of Texas is extorting farmers and small ranchers as well as murdering them with a sniper rifle when they wont pay. The Texas Rangers enter Rawhide to bring justice undercover; Tex as a tramp and Jim and Panhandle as members of a minstrel show.

Cast          
Dave O'Brien as Tex Wyatt 
James Newill as Jim Steele 
Guy Wilkerson as Panhandle Perkins
Nell O'Day as Mary Colby
Ed Cassidy as Henry Colby 
Jack Ingram as Sam Barrett
Billy Bletcher as Jed Bones
Charles King as Frank Hade 
George Chesebro as Joe Gordon
Robert F. Hill as Captain John Wyatt 
Dan White as Minstrel
Lucille Vance as Widow Perriwinkle

See also
The Texas Rangers series:
 The Rangers Take Over (1942)
 Bad Men of Thunder Gap (1943)
 West of Texas (1943)
 Border Buckaroos (1943)
 Fighting Valley (1943)
 Trail of Terror (1943)
 The Return of the Rangers (1943)
 Boss of Rawhide (1943)
 Outlaw Roundup (1944)
 Guns of the Law (1944)
 The Pinto Bandit (1944)
 Spook Town (1944)
 Brand of the Devil (1944)
 Gunsmoke Mesa (1944)
 Gangsters of the Frontier (1944)
 Dead or Alive (1944)
 The Whispering Skull (1944)
 Marked for Murder (1945)
 Enemy of the Law (1945)
 Three in the Saddle (1945)
 Frontier Fugitives (1945)
 Flaming Bullets (1945)

References

External links
 

1943 films
1940s English-language films
American Western (genre) films
1943 Western (genre) films
Producers Releasing Corporation films
Films directed by Elmer Clifton
American black-and-white films
1940s American films